The fifth season of the American television series Supergirl, which is based on the DC Comics character Kara Zor-El / Supergirl, premiered on The CW on October 6, 2019, and consisted of 19 episodes. It is set in the Arrowverse, sharing continuity with the other television series of the franchise. The season is produced by Berlanti Productions, Warner Bros. Television, and DC Entertainment.

The season was ordered in January 2019, and was originally planned to have 22 episodes, later brought down to 20. Filming began that June, and production was shut down in March 2020 due to the COVID-19 pandemic, leaving the season with only 19 episodes.

Melissa Benoist stars as Kara, with principal cast members Mehcad Brooks, Chyler Leigh, Katie McGrath, Jesse Rath, Nicole Maines, and David Harewood also returning from previous seasons. They are joined by Azie Tesfai and Andrea Brooks, who were promoted to the main cast from recurring status in the fourth season, LaMonica Garrett, who previously appeared as a guest actor in the fifth annual Arrowverse crossover and the fifth season, and new cast members Julie Gonzalo and Staz Nair. Former series regulars Jeremy Jordan, Chris Wood, Odette Annable, and Sam Witwer return for the series' 100th episode.

Episodes

Cast and characters

Main 
 Melissa Benoist as Kara Danvers / Kara Zor-El / Supergirl
 Mehcad Brooks as James Olsen / Guardian
 Chyler Leigh as Alex Danvers
 Katie McGrath as Lena Luthor
 Jesse Rath as Querl "Brainy" Dox / Brainiac 5
 Nicole Maines as Nia Nal / Dreamer
 Azie Tesfai as Kelly Olsen
 Andrea Brooks as Eve Teschmacher / Hope
 Julie Gonzalo as Andrea Rojas / Acrata
 Staz Nair as William Dey
 LaMonica Garrett as Mar Novu / Monitor
 David Harewood as J'onn J'onzz / Martian Manhunter and Hank Henshaw

Recurring 
 Jon Cryer as Lex Luthor
 Phil LaMarr as Malefic J'onzz
 Nick Sagar as Russell Rogers / Rip Roar
 Patti Allan as Margot Morrison
 Duncan Fraser as an elderly male Leviathan representative
 Cara Buono as Gamemnae / Gemma Cooper
 Mitch Pileggi as Rama Khan
 Brenda Strong as Lillian Luthor

Guest

"Crisis on Infinite Earths"

Production

Development 
On January 31, 2019, The CW renewed Supergirl for a fifth season. Jessica Queller and Robert Rovner serve as the season's showrunners.

Writing 
Queller described the fifth season of Supergirl as the series' "Black Mirror season", with Rovner elaborating that "What we’re looking at is how technology is impacting the way people engage and giving them an escape not to engage. It seems like nowadays, everyone is kind of on their phones or not really present, and so we wanted to speak to that and kind of how it might be hard to live in the ugliness of what's going on, and how a character like Kara can try and help us overcome that." Melissa Benoist, who stars as Kara Danvers / Supergirl, said the season would be "a fight for [Lena Luthor's] soul", following Lex Luthor exposing to Lena that Kara, her best friend, is Supergirl. Rovner said the rift between Kara and Lena was something the writers had been building towards for a number of years, with the fifth season serving as the "long-awaited payoff". Queller described "betrayal" as Lena's Achilles heel due to every member of the Luthor family having betrayed her in some way over the years: "She has to put on this protective shell, and the last person she thought would betray her was Kara, and that really hurts more deeply than any of the others".

Casting 
Main cast members Melissa Benoist, Mehcad Brooks, Chyler Leigh, Katie McGrath, Jesse Rath, Nicole Maines and David Harewood return as Kara Danvers / Supergirl, James Olsen, Alex Danvers, Lena Luthor, Querl Dox / Brainiac 5, Nia Nal / Dreamer, and J'onn J'onzz respectively. This is Brooks' final season; his last appearance was in the episode "In Plain Sight". Azie Tesfai, who was introduced as Kelly Olsen in the fourth season, was promoted to the main cast for the fifth season, as was Andrea Brooks, who recurred as Eve Teschmacher since the second season. They are joined by new cast members Julie Gonzalo playing Andrea Rojas and Staz Nair playing William Dey, an original creation for the series. Jeremy Jordan, who starred as Winn Schott in the first three seasons and was absent during the fourth, returned as a guest star for three episodes.  The female Brainiac 5 was played by Meaghan Rath, the real-life sister of Brainiac 5 portrayer Jesse Rath, at his suggestion.

Design 
The season introduces a new Supergirl suit which eschews the skirt seen in the older suit in favour of a full pant. Benoist and the showrunners said giving Supergirl pants was something they discussed since the first season. Brainy is credited with creating a new microscopic motion-activator for the new suit that attaches to Kara's glasses, activating her suit's appearance when she removes them.

Filming 
Filming began in late June 2019 at Vancouver. The seventeenth episode of the season marks Benoist's directorial debut. Filming was expected to last until April 14, 2020. On March 12, 2020, Warner Bros. Television shut down production on the series due to the COVID-19 pandemic, with the series in the middle of shooting episode 20. Leigh stated she had two more days of filming on the episode. As a result, some of the material shot for episode 20 was incorporated into episode 19, rather than saving it for season six. Some new dialogue was also recorded by actors in their homes for episode 19.

Arrowverse tie-ins 
In December 2018, during the end of the annual crossover "Elseworlds", a follow up crossover was announced titled "Crisis on Infinite Earths" based on the comic book series of the same name. The crossover took place over five episodes–three (including the Supergirl episode) in December 2019 and two in January 2020.

Broadcast 
The season began airing in the United States on The CW on October 6, 2019. It was originally set to run for 22 episodes, later brought down to 20. As production on episode 20 could not be completed due to the COVID-19 pandemic, the 19th episode served as the season finale.

Reception

Ratings

Critical response 
On review aggregator Rotten Tomatoes, the season holds an approval rating of 92% based on 8 reviews, with an average rating of 7.62/10.

Notes

References 

2019 American television seasons
2020 American television seasons
Supergirl (TV series) seasons
Television productions suspended due to the COVID-19 pandemic
Television series set in 2020